David Solomons may refer to:

 David Solomons (photographer) (born 1965), British street photographer
 David Solomons (accounting scholar) (1912–1995), British-born accounting scholar who became an American citizen in 1976

See also
David Salomon (disambiguation)
David Solomon (disambiguation)